Eason Jordan is the CEO of Oryx Strategies, a New York-based strategic planning and communications company he founded in December 2017.

He previously helped launch and lead CNN, NowThis, the Malala Fund and several of his own companies.

At CNN, where he worked 1982-2005, he served as chief news executive and president of newsgathering and international networks.

He subsequently (2005-2012) headed several companies he founded, including Poll Position, Headline Apps and Praedict.

In 2012, he joined NowThis, a digital video news service, as its founding general manager, working there for two years.

He later (2014-2017) served as a director at the Malala Fund, the education-focused foundation launched by Malala Yousafzai, the youngest-ever Nobel Peace Prize laureate and U.N. Messenger of Peace. He initially served as the organization's director of operations and communications and later as its director of special projects.

Jordan serves on the board of trustees of the Fugees Family NGO and the advisory council of Stanford's Human Perception Lab, and he is member of the Council on Foreign Relations and the ONE Campaign.

He was portrayed by the actor Clark Gregg in Live From Baghdad (2002), a film about the team of CNN journalists who covered the first Gulf War. As CNN was the only news organization broadcasting live, firsthand reports from Baghdad, the Iraqi capital, for most of the war, this is widely considered the event that "put CNN on the map".

Awards 
He is the recipient of four Emmy Awards, two Peabody Awards and the DuPont-Columbia Award. At the age of 31, he received the Livingston Award's "Special Citation For Outstanding Achievement" (previously only given posthumously) for coverage of the Gulf War, the Soviet crisis, and the African famine. The Livingston Awards for excellence by professionals under the age of 35 are the largest all-media, general reporting prizes in American journalism.

Controversy 
On April 11, 2003, Jordan revealed that CNN knew about human rights abuses committed in Iraq by Saddam Hussein since 1990 in an article in The New York Times called "The News We Kept to Ourselves".

As also described in the same article, Jordan personally met with Uday Hussein, eldest son of Saddam Hussein of Iraq, in 1995 at the Iraqi Olympic Committee headquarters, where Hussein told Jordan he intended to assassinate his two sons-in-law, Hussein Kamel and Saddam Kamel, who had defected to Jordan and exposed the Iraqi regime. They were eventually killed upon their return to Iraq.

Alleged comments at 2005 World Economic Forum
On January 27, 2005, during the World Economic Forum annual meeting in Davos, Switzerland, Jordan was reported to have said that American troops were targeting journalists. Although there is no transcript of Jordan's statement (the event was videotaped, but the WEF refused to release it, or make a transcript of the event), Barney Frank claimed Jordan seemed to be suggesting "it was official military policy to take out journalists", and later added that some U.S. soldiers targeted reporters "maybe knowing they were killing journalists, out of anger"—claims that Jordan denied. However, U.S. News & World Report editor-at-large David Gergen, who moderated the discussion, and BBC executive Richard Sambrook defended Jordan and claimed his remarks, though controversial, were not as extreme as they were hyped and that he did not deserve to be removed from CNN. But U.S. entrepreneur Rony Abovitz, former CNN reporter Rebecca MacKinnon, U.S. journalist Bret Stephens, Swiss journalist Bernard Rapazz, U.S. Senator Chris Dodd, and French historian Justin Vaïsse were also present, and confirmed the essentials of Frank's account. Bloggers who covered the story (most newspapers and networks chose not to) noted that Jordan had been accusing Israeli and U.S. troops of deliberately targeting journalists as early as October 2002, and had made similar specific claims about Iraq in November 2004. They also noted his admission, in a New York Times Op-Ed piece, that CNN had deliberately downplayed the brutality of the Saddam Hussein regime in order to maintain CNN's access to the country. For this last piece, he was harshly criticized by the New Republic's Franklin Foer, in an article in The Wall Street Journal, who said CNN should have left Iraq rather than spread the regime's propaganda.

On February 11, 2005, Jordan resigned to "prevent CNN from being unfairly tarnished by the controversy over conflicting accounts of my recent remarks regarding the alarming number of journalists killed in Iraq". In a press release, Jordan also stated that "I have great admiration and respect for the men and women of the U.S. armed forces, with whom I have worked closely and been embedded in Baghdad, Tikrit, and Mosul".

References

External links 
 Eason Jordan's web site
 Eason Jordan's bio at WEF
 Eason Jordan's bio at CNN CNN 1996
 
  The News We Kept to Ourselves
 CNN executive: Iraq targeted network's journalists CNN April 11, 2003
 Do US Troops Target Journalists in Iraq?
 CNN News Executive Eason Jordan Quits AP Reuters February 11, 2005
 NowThis News's web site
 "Fast Company" report on NowThis News
 "Fortune" magazine report on NowThis News
 "American Journalism Review" report on NowThis News 
 "Columbia Journalism Review" report on NowThis News
 TV Newser report on Jordan joining NowThis News
 "Fast Company" report on Jordan's role at the Malala Fund

American television executives
CNN executives
Living people
Peabody Award winners
Emmy Award winners
Year of birth missing (living people)